Domenico Morelli (4 August 182313 August 1901) was an Italian painter, who mainly produced historical and religious works. Morelli was immensely influential in the arts of the second half of the 19th century, both as director of the Accademia di Belle Arti in Naples, but also because of his rebelliousness against institutions: traits that flourished into the passionate, often patriotic, Romantic and later Symbolist subjects of his canvases. Morelli was the teacher of Vincenzo Petrocelli and Ulisse Caputo.

Biography
He was born to a poor family in Naples. His mother had hoped he would become a priest. His precocious talent was noted, and he was enrolled at the Royal Academy of Fine Arts in Naples in 1836–1846, where he befriended Francesco Altamura. His early works contain imagery drawn from the Medieval stories and Romantic poets such as Byron. In 1845, he painted a prize-winning .

Morelli had just returned to Naples, when the insurrections of 1848 erupted in Naples. He joined the protesters in the barricades on via Toledo, and was wounded, nearly killed, and briefly imprisoned. In a retrospective published after his death, Isabella Anderton would label Domenico as one of the warrior artists of Italy, a group which also included Filippo Palizzi, Telemaco Signorini, Stefano Ussi, and Francesco Saverio Altamura.

Released, Morelli returned to Rome. In 1855 at the Florentine Exposition, he displayed his famous The Iconoclasts.

He participated in the Universal Exposition in Paris in 1855. Later, in Florence, he was an active participant in the Macchiaioli discussions on Realism. Morelli claimed that it was these discussions that made his own work less academic and helped him to develop a freer style and to experiment with color. In this period, he is grouped into the school of Realism.

In 1857, he won a contest to design the decoration of the church of San Francesco of Gaeta, a project never completed. For the ceiling of the Royal chapel of Naples, he painted an Assumption of the Virgin.

He was appointed consultant for new acquisitions of the Capodimonte art museum in Naples and, thus, had significant impact on the subsequent direction of the collections. In 1868, Morelli became a professor of painting at his old Academy, which now became the Royal Institute of Fine Arts in Naples. From that period onward, his interest turned to religious and mystical themes, drawn from mostly Christian, but also Jewish and Muslim traditions. Perhaps best known from this period is the Assumption on the ceiling of the Royal Palace in Naples. Morelli was also one of the collaborators for the illustrations of the Amsterdam Bible in 1895. From 1899 until his death, he was president of the Royal Academy of Fine Arts in Naples.

Morelli late in life won many awards and distinctions. he was named honorary professor of the principal academies of Italy and Europe, commendatore of the Order of SS. In June, 1886, he was knighted a senator by the King.
He died on 13 August 1901 in Naples.

Among his many pupils were Giuseppe Costa, Francesco Paolo Michetti, Vittorio Matteo Corcos, Giuseppe Boschetto, Camillo Miola, Edoardo Tofano, Antonio Mancini and Enrico Salfi. Morelli designed the frescoes painted for the tomb of Giacomo Leopardi, located in the church of San Vitale at Fuorigrotta, but they were completed posthumously by his son-in-law, Paolo Vetri.

Gallery

References

Sources

External links
 

19th-century Italian painters
Italian male painters
Realist artists
19th-century Neapolitan people
1823 births
1901 deaths
Academic art
People of the First Italian War of Independence
Accademia di Belle Arti di Napoli alumni
Academic staff of the Accademia di Belle Arti di Napoli
19th-century Italian male artists